Viktor Andersson (born 17 August 2003) is a Swedish racing driver. He currently competes in the U.S. F2000 National Championship with Velocity Racing Development.

Racing career

U.S. F2000 National Championship 
On 19 December 2022, it was announced that Andersson would move up to the U.S. F2000 National Championship with Velocity Racing Development to compete in the 2022 season.

Racing record

Career summary 

* Season still in progress.

American open-wheel racing results

U.S. F2000 National Championship 
(key) (Races in bold indicate pole position) (Races in italics indicate fastest lap) (Races with * indicate most race laps led)

* Season still in progress.

References 

2003 births
Living people
Swedish racing drivers
U.S. F2000 National Championship drivers
Sportspeople from Linköping

Karting World Championship drivers
United States F4 Championship drivers